Gerard Tichy (also Gérard Tichy, Gerhard Tichi and Gerardo Tichy, 11 March 1920 – 11 April 1992) was a Spanish actor of German descent, who appeared in numerous movies, including several international productions. He was born in Weißenfels, Germany, on 11 March 1920, and died in Madrid, Spain, on 11 April 1992.

Biography

Tichy participated in World War II and held the rank of a lieutenant when it ended. He was put in a French POW camp but soon managed to escape to Spain. There he started his film career in the war epic Balarrasa (1951) and quickly became a prominent character actor in Spanish cinema, ultimately appearing in 99 films over the course of his career.

A capable if not fluent English speaker, Tichy also appeared in several international productions that were filmed in Spain, most notably King of Kings (1961) as Joseph, El Cid (1961) playing King Ramirez, and Doctor Zhivago (1965) as Liberius, a Red partisan commander.

He appeared in numerous spaghetti Westerns, most notably Sergio Corbucci's Compañeros (1971). He also worked with noted Spanish horror film directors such as Jesus Franco (Marquis de Sade: Justine), Paul Naschy (The Beast and the Magic Sword) and Amando de Ossorio (Serpiente del mar), and famed Italian director Mario Bava (Hatchet for the Honeymoon).

Selected filmography

 Neutrality (1949) - Deutscher Offizier
 Black Jack (1950)
 Service at Sea (1951) - Pasajero (uncredited)
 Servicio en la mar (1951) - Pasajero (uncredited)
 Cerca del cielo (1951) - Camarada defensor (uncredited)
 The Floor Burns (1952) - Eduardo Behovia
 Come Die My Love (1952) - Bill
 The Call of Africa (1952) - Capitán Andrade
 Hombre acosado (1952) - Jan Matiz
 Barco sin rumbo (1952)
 Cuba Cabana (1952) - Polizei-Oberst
 Decameron Nights (1953)
 I Was a Parish Priest (1953) - El Negro
 Pasaporte para un ángel (Órdenes secretas) (1954)
 Judas' Kiss (1954) - Pontius Pilate
 An Impossible Crime (1954) - Eugenio Certal
 He Died Fifteen Years Ago (1954) - Germán Goeritz
 Malaga (1954) - Cronkhite
 Kubala (1955)
 Lo que nunca muere (1955) - Pierre
 The Cock Crow (1955) - Gans
 Nunca es demasiado tarde (1956) - Jorge
 Alexander the Great (1956) - (uncredited)
 Miedo (1956)
 Curra Veleta (1956) - Alfredo Brighton
 Minutos antes (1956)
 Cuando el valle se cubra de nieve (1957)
 ...Y eligió el infierno (1957)
 Aquellos tiempos del cuplé (1958) - Jorge
 Cuatro en la frontera (1958) - Julio
 Hospital general (1958)
 El frente infinito (1959) - Capitán Estrada
 Molokai, la isla maldita (1959) - Capitán
 Un ángel tuvo la culpa (1960) - Sr. X
 Alerta en el cielo (1961) - Sargento Bell
 King of Kings (1961) - Joseph
 El Cid (1961) - King Ramiro 
 Pecado de amor (1961) - Gerardo Esquivel
 The Happy Thieves (1961) - Antonio, Prado Museum Guard
 Queen of The Chantecler (1962) - Henri Duchel
 Face of Terror (1962) - Dr. Chambers
 Los culpables (1962) - Salvador
 Senda torcida (1963) - Silvestre
 The Blancheville Monster (1963) - Rodéric De Blancheville
 Casablanca, Nest of Spies (1963) - Mayor
 The Secret Seven (1963) - Rabirio
 La muerte silba un blues (1964) - Carlos Moroni
 La Chance et l'Amour (1964) - Un truand (segment "Une chance explosive")
 Desafío en Río Bravo (1964) - Zack Williams
 Un tiro por la espalda (1964)
 El niño y el muro (1965) - Guardia alemán #2
 The Hell of Manitoba (1965) - Jack Villaine
 That Man in Istanbul (1965) - Charly Cohen
 Marie-Chantal contre le docteur Kha (1965) - Maitre d'Hôtel
 Man from Canyon City (1965) - Hargitay
 Playa de Formentor (1965) - Carlos Sanromá
 Train d'enfer (1965) - Matras
 100.000 dollari per Ringo (1965) - Tom Sherry
 Doctor Zhivago (1965) - Liberius, Red Partisan Commander
 Agent X-77 Orders to Kill (1966) - Dr. Reichmann
 Cuatro dólares de venganza (1966) - Clifford
 The Sea Pirate (1966) - Kernan
 Le Solitaire passe à l'attaque (1966) - Bernsen
 The Texican (1966) - Boyd Thompson
 Il grande colpo di Surcouf (1966) - Kernan
 Superargo Versus Diabolicus (1966) - Diabolikus 
 Master Stroke (1967) - Max
 Face to Face (1967) - Mayor of Silvertown (uncredited)
 Madigan's Millions (1968) - J. P. Ogilvie
 The Magnificent Tony Carrera (1968) - Serge
 Sartana Does Not Forgive (1968) - Joe Sullivan
 They Came to Rob Las Vegas (1968) - Sheriff Klinger
 Hot Line (1968) - Truman
 Cantando a la vida (1969)
 Hora cero: Operación Rommel (1969) - Gen. von Gruber
 Marquis de Sade: Justine (1969) - Comte Courville
 Murder by Music (1969) - Inspector 
 Hatchet for the Honeymoon (1970) - Dr. Kalleway
 Cuadrilátero (1970) - Óscar
 El último día de la guerra (1970) - Pvt. Bronc
 Compañeros (1970) - Lieutenant
 Un verano para matar (1972) - Alex
 Les Charlots font l'Espagne (1972) - Le capitaine du grand voilier
 La isla misteriosa y el capitán Nemo (1973) - Cyrus Smith
 The Corruption of Chris Miller (1973) - Commissioner
 La orgía de los muertos (1973) - Professor Leon Droila
 Striptease (1978) - Play Boy
 Venus de fuego (1978) - Detective
 Maravillas (1981) - Benito
 Misterio en la isla de los monstruos (1981) (a.k.a. Mystery on Monster Island) - Capt. Turkott
 L'ultimo harem (1981) - (uncredited)
 Los diablos del mar (1982) - Captain Hull
 Pieces (1982) - Dr. Jennings
 La Bestia y la Espada Magica (1983) (a.k.a. The Beast and the Magic Sword) - Otton el grande
 La hoz y el Martínez (1985) - Dimitri Vasilievich
 ¡Qué tía la C.I.A.! (1985) - Agente de la RFA
 Serpiente de mar (1985) a.k.a. The Sea Serpent
 Romanza final (Gayarre) (1986)
 Yo me bajo en la próxima, ¿y usted? (1992) - (final film role)

References

External links

1920 births
1992 deaths
Spanish male film actors
German emigrants to Spain
German Army officers of World War II
Male actors from Madrid
Male Spaghetti Western actors
20th-century Spanish male actors
20th-century German male actors
German male film actors
German prisoners of war in World War II held by France
Escapees from French detention
German escapees
People from Weißenfels